Nimgan (also Romanized as Nīmgān) is a village in Irandegan Rural District, Irandegan District, Khash County, Sistan and Baluchestan Province, Iran. At the 2006 census, its population was 37, in 7 families.

This village is in the Irandegan Rural District, Irandegan District, Khash County, Sistan and Baluchestan Province.

References 

Populated places in Khash County